Constantine Lascaris ( Kostantinos Láskaris; 1434 – 15 August 1501) was a Greek scholar and grammarian, one of the promoters of the revival of Greek learning in Italy during the Renaissance, born in Constantinople.

Life
Constantine Lascaris was born in Constantinople, where he was educated by the scholar John Argyropoulos, Gemistus Pletho's friend and pupil. After the fall of Constantinople in 1453, he took refuge in Rhodes and then in Italy, where Francesco Sforza, Duke of Milan, appointed him Greek tutor to his daughter Hippolyta. Here was published his Grammatica Graeca, sive compendium octo orationis partium, remarkable as being probably the first book entirely in Greek issued from the printing press, in 1476.

After leaving Milan in 1465, Lascaris taught in Rome and in Naples, to which he had been summoned by Ferdinand I to deliver a course of lectures on Greece. In the following year, on the invitation of the inhabitants, and especially of Ludovico Saccano, he settled in Messina (Sicily). On the recommendation of Cardinal Bessarion, he was appointed to succeed Andronikos Galaziotes to teach Greek to the Basilian monks of the island.  He continued to work in Messina until his death, teaching many pupils who came on purpose to Sicily, from all over Italy, to learn grammar and Greek culture from him.

Among his numerous pupils in Milan was Giorgio Valla and, in Messina, Pietro Bembo, Angelo Gabrieli, Urbano Valeriani, Cola Bruno, Bernardino Rizzo, Francesco Faraone, Antonio Maurolico (the father of Francesco Maurolico), Francesco Giannelli and Cristóbal Escobar. Lascaris bequeathed his library of valuable manuscripts of philosophy, science and magic to the Senate of Messina; the collection, after the Messina revolt (1674-1678), was confiscated and carried to Spain and is now in the Spanish National Library in Madrid. In the second half of the sixteenth century his tomb in Messina was totally destroyed during the repression of the Counter-Reformation. He was a typical Renaissance humanist, with polymathic interests, but especially in Neoplatonism combined with Pythagoreanism (which was dear to many contemporary Byzantine scholars). Through his pupils Antonio Maurolico, Francesco Faraone and Giacomo Notese-Genovese his knowledge reached the scientist Francesco Maurolico.

Lascaris died in Messina in 1501.

Work
The Grammatica, which has often been reprinted (including the famous Manuzio's edition of 1494–1495 with the Golden Verses of Pythagoras), is the most valuable work produced by Lascaris. In 1499 at Messina he published the Vitae illustrium philosophorum siculorum et calabrorum, with the first Renaissance biography of Pythagoras. Some of his letters are given by Johannes Iriarte in the Regiae Bibliothecae Matritensis codices Graeci manuscripti (Madrid, 1769). His name was later known to readers in the romance of Abel-François Villemain, Lascaris, ou les Grecs du quinzieme siècle (1825). See also John Edwin Sandys, Hist. Class. Schol., ed. 2, vol. ii (1908), pp. 76 foll.

See also
Greek scholars in the Renaissance

References

Attribution:

References

 Fernández Pomar, José María (1966). "La colección de Uceda y los manuscritos griegos de Constantino Láscaris", Emerita, 34, 1966, 211–88.
 Harris, Jonathan (1995). Greek Émigrés in the West, 1400-1520, Camberley UK: Porphyrogenitus, 1995. 
 Martínez Manzano, Teresa (1994). Konstantinos Laskaris. Humanist, Philologe, Lehrer, Kopist, Hamburg, 1994.
 Russo, Attilio (2003-2004). "Costantino Lascaris tra fama e oblio nel Cinquecento messinese", Archivio Storico Messinese, 84–85, Messina 2003–2004, 5-87. 
 Russo, Attilio (2018). "Una nuova ipotesi sul nome ‘Maurolico’ ", Archivio Storico Messinese, 99, Messina 2018, 37-71. 
 De Rosalia, Antonino (1958). "La vita di Costantino Lascaris", Archivio Storico Siciliano, 3, IX, 1957–1958, 21–70.
 Vassileiou, Fotis-Saribalidou, Barbara (2007). Short Biographical Lexicon of Byzantine Academics Immigrants in Western Europe, 2007.
 Wilson, Nigel Guy (1992). From Byzantium to Italy. Greek Studies in the Italian Renaissance, London, 1992.

External links
Excerpt from one of his works - on Diodorus Siculus

1434 births
1501 deaths
Constantinopolitan Greeks
Byzantine grammarians
15th-century Byzantine people
15th-century Greek people
Greek educators
Italian people of Greek descent
Greek Renaissance humanists
Greek refugees
15th-century Byzantine writers
15th-century Greek writers
15th-century Greek educators
People from Constantinople